Henry Ametepey is a Ghanaian politician and a former deputy Volta Regional Minister of Ghana. He was appointed by President John Evan Atta Mills and sworn in during February 2012, and served till January 2013.

References

Living people
National Democratic Congress (Ghana) politicians
Year of birth missing (living people)